Andrew Edward Tonkovich (November 1, 1922 – September 2, 2006) was an American professional basketball player and coach. He was selected as the first overall pick in the 1948 BAA draft by the Providence Steamrollers. He played college basketball for the Marshall Thundering Herd.

Basketball career

College career
Tonkovich led the Thundering Herd as team captain to the NAIB championship in 1947. He was named to the All-Tournament team and the NAIB All-American first-team. Tonkovich scored 1,578 points for the Thundering Herd, which was a record for the program at the time.

Professional career
After his college career, he was selected as the first overall pick in the 1948 BAA draft by the Providence Steamrollers.

Tonkovich played 17 games for the Steamrollers during the 1948–49 BAA season. He left the team midseason and signed with the Wheeling Blues of the All-American Basketball League as a player-coach.

After Basketball

After his playing retirement, Tonkovich became a high school coach and physical education teacher in West Virginia and Florida. He served as the basketball coach at St. John Central High School in Bellaire, Ohio, from 1952 to 1954. Tonkovich was inducted into the NAIA Hall of Fame in 1973 and the Marshall Athletic Hall of Fame in 1985.

Career statistics

BAA
Source

Regular season

References

External links
Career statistics

1922 births
2006 deaths
American people of Croatian descent
American men's basketball coaches
American men's basketball players
All-American college men's basketball players
Basketball coaches from West Virginia
Basketball players from West Virginia
Marshall Thundering Herd men's basketball players
People from Benwood, West Virginia
People from Inverness, Florida
Point guards
Providence Steamrollers draft picks
Providence Steamrollers players
Sportspeople from Wheeling, West Virginia